Onisiforos Roushias (born 15 July 1992) is a Cypriot professional footballer who plays as a striker for Cypriot First Division club Enosis Neon Paralimni.

Club career

Enosis Neon Paralimni 
Born in Paralimni, he began playing football with other children his age for Enosis Neon Paralimni Academy. He was the best goal-scorer for Cyprus National Under 17 league, scoring 26 goals and winning the League with EN Paralimni U-17 team.

Middlesbrough 
Roushias skills and achievements caused English side Middlesbrough to sign him on 1 January 2009. Roushias stayed there for 2.5 years making appearances for Middlesbrough Reserves and Middlesbrough Under 18 team. At Middlesbrough, he improved his skills and prepared ready for a career in a Cypriot First Division team.

Return to Enosis Neon Paralimni 
On 31 July 2011, Roushias returned to Cyprus for a transfer to Enosis Neon Paralimni. This time he was ready to take more chances, and prove that he was able to play for Enosis. Having 18 appearances and scoring two goals in 2011–2012 season, Roushias showed that he could be considered one of the great talents on the island. In the 2012–2013 season, Roushias was apparently sidelined by Enosis manager Ton Caanen, having only eight appearances (seven as a substitution), something that made him to ask for a free transfer. So Roushias left EN Paralimni on 28 December 2012.

Omonia Nicosia 
Just a few days after Roushias left Enosis Neon Paralimni, Omonia showed their interest in him. On 1 January 2013, Roushias signed a 2.5 years contract with Omonia. He had 74 appearances with the club and scored 17 goals. On 26 May 2017, the club announced that with end of the season the player is released.

Anorthosis Famagusta 
On 16 June 2021, Roushias signed a two-year contract until 2023 with Cypriot First Division club Anorthosis Famagusta.

International career 
Roushias represented Cyprus at youth level. In May 2014, he made his first appearance for the Cyprus first team squad against Japan.

Career statistics

Club

Honours
AEK Larnaca
 Cypriot Cup: 2017–18
 Cypriot Super Cup: 2018

References

External links 
 

1992 births
Living people
Cypriot footballers
Cyprus under-21 international footballers
Cyprus international footballers
Enosis Neon Paralimni FC players
AC Omonia players
AEK Larnaca FC players
Ermis Aradippou FC players
Anorthosis Famagusta F.C. players
Cypriot First Division players
Association football forwards
Cyprus youth international footballers
People from Paralimni